Old Corral is an unincorporated community in Madera County, California. It lies at an elevation of 3310 feet (1009 m).

References

Unincorporated communities in California
Unincorporated communities in Madera County, California